Zaghanabad (also Romanized as Zaghanābād; also known as Ziganab and Zīqānāb) is a village in Ozomdel-e Jonubi Rural District, in the Central District of Varzaqan County, East Azerbaijan Province, Iran. At the 2006 census, its population was 347, in 61 families.  The village was damaged in the 2012 East Azerbaijan earthquakes.

References 

Towns and villages in Varzaqan County